On 28 September 2022, the BBC announced that the third series of Race Across the World due to enter production later that same year, would be set entirely in Canada with a route from Vancouver, British Columbia to St. John's, Newfoundland, and Labrador. The programme would also move from BBC Two to BBC One.

In a subsequent press release dated 15 March 2023, the BBC revealed the five pairs of competitors as Cathie and Tricia, Claudia and Kevin, Ladi and Monique, Marc and Michael, Mobeen, and Zainib. The air date for the first episode of the new series was slated as 22 March 2023.

Contestants

Results summary 
Colour key:

  – Team withdrawn
  – Team eliminated
  – Series winners

Route 
The checkpoints in the third series are:

Race summary

Leg 1: Vancouver → Tlell, Haida Gwaii 

The race started from Stanley Park in Vancouver, British Columbia finishing the first leg in the village of Tlell on the east coast of Graham Island in the Haida Gwaii archipelago.

Leg 2: Tlell, Haida Gwaii → Dawson City 

The race continued from Tlell in the Haida Gwaii archipelago to former gold rush town of Dawson City in the Yukon.

Ratings

References

External links 

 Race Across the World (series 1)
 Race Across the World (series 2)

2023 British television seasons
Television shows filmed in Canada